Youssoupha Mbengué (born 29 September 1991) is a Senegalese football midfielder who most recently played for Al-Kawkab.

References

1991 births
Living people
Senegalese footballers
CA Bizertin players
Al-Wakrah SC players
Al-Kawkab FC players
Association football midfielders
Tunisian Ligue Professionnelle 1 players
Qatar Stars League players
Qatari Second Division players
Saudi First Division League players
Senegalese expatriate footballers
Expatriate footballers in Tunisia
Senegalese expatriate sportspeople in Tunisia
Expatriate footballers in Qatar
Senegalese expatriate sportspeople in Qatar
Expatriate footballers in Saudi Arabia
Senegalese expatriate sportspeople in Saudi Arabia